Patrick Favre (born 30 July 1972) is a former Italian biathlete. At the Biathlon World Championships 1997 in Osrblie he won a bronze medal with the Italian relay team. Two years later at the Biathlon World Championships 1999 in Kontiolahti he won a silver medal in the sprint event. In the 1994–95 season he came second in the overall World Cup behind Jon Åge Tyldum. After the 2000–01 season, he retired as biathlete, though he had a short-lived comeback during the 2003–04 season. Following his retirement, he became a coach, spending seven years with the Italian national biathlon team before joining the French national men's biathlon team in June 2018 on a four-year contract.

Biathlon results
All results are sourced from the International Biathlon Union.

Olympic Games

World Championships
3 medals (1 silver, 2 bronze)

*During Olympic seasons competitions are only held for those events not included in the Olympic program.
**Team was removed as an event in 1998, and pursuit was added in 1997 with mass start being added in 1999.

Individual victories
2 victories (1 In, 1 Sp)

*Results are from UIPMB and IBU races which include the Biathlon World Cup, Biathlon World Championships and the Winter Olympic Games.

Further notable results
 1993: 3rd, Italian championships of biathlon, sprint
 1996: 2nd, Italian championships of biathlon
 1998:
 2nd, Italian championships of biathlon
 2nd, Italian championships of biathlon, sprint
 3rd, Italian championships of biathlon, pursuit
 1999: 1st, Italian championships of biathlon
 2000:
 1st, Italian championships of biathlon
 1st, Italian championships of biathlon, pursuit
 2001:
 1st, Italian championships of biathlon, sprint
 3rd, Italian championships of biathlon
 3rd, Italian championships of biathlon, pursuit
 2004: 3rd, Italian championships of biathlon, pursuit

References

External links
 
 

1972 births
Living people
People from Aosta
Biathletes of Gruppo Sportivo Esercito
Italian male biathletes
Biathletes at the 1994 Winter Olympics
Biathletes at the 1998 Winter Olympics
Olympic biathletes of Italy
Biathlon World Championships medalists
Sportspeople from Aosta Valley
Cross-country skiing coaches
Italian sports coaches